Zlatko Mateša (born 17 June 1949) is a Croatian politician who served as Prime Minister of Croatia from 1995 to 2000. A member of the Croatian Democratic Union, Mateša is currently the president of the Croatian Olympic Committee and honorary consul of Mongolia in Croatia.

Mateša was born and grew up in Zagreb, then Federal People's Republic of Yugoslavia, and obtained a law degree at the University of Zagreb in 1974. He worked in INA since 1978, where he rose through the ranks to the position of an assistant director. He was friends with Nikica Valentić, Mladen Vedriš and Franjo Gregurić.

In 1990, he entered politics and became a high-ranking HDZ member, along with the aforementioned group. President Franjo Tuđman named him the sixth President of the Government on 4 November 1995. The Mateša government is perhaps best remembered for the introduction of the value-added tax, which originated from the previous government before being put to effect from 1996 under Mateša's government. In 1998, the tax rate was fixed for all products at 22%. The finance minister in the Cabinet of Zlatko Mateša was Borislav Škegro.

In the 2000 Croatian parliamentary election he was elected into the Sabor and served until the end of 2003.

Since 2002, Mateša is the president of the Croatian Olympic Committee (HOO). In 2009, Mateša obtained a Ph.D. degree from Beijing Sport University.

See also 
 Cabinet of Zlatko Mateša
 Awards - In June 2018, Mateša Inducted into Power Brands LIFE – Hall of Fame at London International Forum for Equality

References

1949 births
Living people
Politicians from Zagreb
Faculty of Law, University of Zagreb alumni
Prime Ministers of Croatia
Croatian Democratic Union politicians
Croatian sports executives and administrators
Economy ministers of Croatia